Genic (stylized as _genic) is the twelfth and final studio album and final bilingual (English–Japanese) album by Japanese recording artist Namie Amuro. It was released on June 10, 2015 in three physical formats, and for digital consumption; additionally, it serves as the singer's final studio record since her retirement announcement for September 2018. The album was handled by Western producers, including David Guetta, Bardur Haberg, Joacim "Twin" Persson, Sophie, amongst others. Stylistically, Genic divides its sound between electronic dance music and R&B, and focuses on themes of self-empowerment, having fun, glamour and fashion.

Genic received positive reviews from music critics. Majority of the reviews praised Genic'''s production values and mixture of genres, although Amuro's English deliveries and certain collaborations were noted as flaws to the album. Additionally, the album was received nominations and accolades for its success in various forms. Commercially, the album was a success in Japan, peaking at number one on the Oricon Albums Chart and Billboard Chart. It was certified platinum by the Recording Industry Association of Japan (RIAJ) for shipments of 250,000 units.

Although no physical singles were released, Amuro's rendition of Guetta's track "What I Did for Love" was distributed as a promotional recording on July 1, 2015. In order to promote the album, Amuro shot music videos for the album material "Golden Touch", "Birthday", "Fashionista", "B Who I Want 2 B", "Stranger" and "Anything". Amuro performed the album's content on her Livegenic and her annual Live Style concert tours, which traveled throughout Japan; a live DVD with the same name was distributed the following year.

Background
In 2013, Amuro launched her own record label Dimension Point, in partnership with Avex Trax and their management. Originally, the singer had intended to depart from Avex and the management company Vision Factory after seventeen years together. However, Avex confirmed that Dimension Point would be put in place to allow Amuro to take control of her music and personal ventures. This led to the release of her eleventh studio and second Bilingual album Feel (2013). After this, she returned to releasing maxi-singles, commencing with "Tsuki" the following year and "Brighter Day" in November.

In January 2015, Amuro purchased a home in Los Angeles, California in order to improve her English skills, rumored to effect her upcoming record. That same month, she departed from her management Rising Productions—formally Vision Factory—after 22 years together, and started a private agency with Dimension Point called Stella88. In May, Amuro revealed a special video from her YouTube account, confirming the release of Genic. The visual—featuring lyric videos for all 12 unpublished recordings—were placed on a trial period from the start of May to its ending date, and Amuro's website also hosted a special website dedicated to the album's material.

Development and productionGenic is Amuro's first and only studio album to be handled by Western and European musicians—whereas her previous Bilingual records would include a mixture of Western and Asian-based producers and songwriters. However, Japanese singers Tiger and Emyli, whom worked with Amuro in previous efforts, served as additional songwriters to the tracks "Photogenic", "Birthday", "Fashionista" and "Stranger". Production on Genic started in mid-2014 whilst touring for her Live Style shows. Amuro commented to Japanese fashion magazine Sweet that she wanted to create an album that sounded as it was in "trend", and stated that "My staff understands my vision and made a selection of demo’s for me. As always, I chose the songs which instantly felt right to me."

In the end, Amuro felt that choosing the final songs was easy because she favored the demo's intro's rather than its entire form; producers changed and distorted the selected tracks that appealed to her. She commented that the "full song was different from the impression the intro left on me." Additionally, two collaborations made the final cut: a track titled "B Who I Want 2 B" that featured Japanese vocaloid Hatsune Miku—whom went under the anagram U Hum Speak It, prior to the album's announcement—and a cover version of Guetta's track "What I Did for Love", which featured original vocals from English singer Emeli Sande. Furthermore, Genic is Amuro's first album not to feature any pre-released singles, her to do so since her debut record Dance Tracks Vol.1 (1995). The tracks "Tsuki" and "Brighter Day", alongside digital releases "Neonlight Lipstick", "Ballerina", "Sweet Kisses" and "Still Lovin' You", were put up for discussion by Stella88 to be included in the album. However, Amuro declined, and their status as "commercial tie-ins" and their sonic similarities to unpublished songs on Genic were the reason for its omission.

In total, more than 200 demos were created during the music sessions, including additional productions by Guetta and German-Russian DJ Zedd. This is her first record that includes no full-length Japanese song, with the exceptions of "Golden Touch", "B Who I Want 2 B" and "Stranger" featuring very few lyrics in Japanese. Every other song were purely written and recorded in English language, making it her third Bilingual record after Uncontrolled (2012) and Feel (2013). The content was recorded at Prime Sound Studios, LAB Recordings, ABS Recordings, and Bunkamura Studios in Tokyo, Japan, with the final material mixed by D.O.I. at Daiminion Recordings, and mastered by Tom Coyne at Sterling Sound Studios in New York City.

Music and songs
Stylistically, Genic divides its sound between 1970s–1980s electronic dance music, and 1990s R&B, with lyrical content focusing on themes of self-empowerment, having fun, glamour and fashion. Lauren du Plessis, writing for Electric Bloom Magazine, opined that the album encompasses every genre from her career, "there’s some ultra-fluffy teen pop, flashes of her R’n’B phase, and plenty of popular dance elements." Similarly, though The Japan Times reporter Patrick St. Michel found the album influenced by EDM, he also noted "diverse" genres such as europop and contemporary pop music. In a similar review, Kenichi Shirahara from Utalabo.com compared the sound to Amuro's previous studio album Feel (2013) but identified musical elements such as new wave and disco music in Genic.

The album opens with "Photogenic", a Westernized R&B number that includes live electric guitars and bass. Lyrically, the track's use of "narcissis[tic]" themes was noted as one of key themes to the record. "Time Has Come"—a dance tune that incorporates elements of 8-bit—features various tempo changes through its composition, and discusses her ambition to escape a "sleeping town" and have fun. "Golden Touch" returns to R&B with a "goofy" production, whereas du Plessis believes it was one of the tracks heavily inspired by the 1980s music era. The cheerful composition of "Birthday", the album's fourth track, was compared to another titular song by American singer Katy Perry, and was noted for its very "girly" appeal. The song "It" was described as a love song by critics, and features uptempo instrumentation and various whistles through its hook "Be it, I just wanna be it,". "Scream" is the first track on the album that delves into EDM, namely electro house sounds; the track talks about having fun, and enjoying the music at night.

According to du Plessis, "Fashionista" shared a similar theme of narcissism and glamour with "Photogenic", but included subtle elements of dubstep in its composition. A reviewer at CD Journal pointed out a blend between R&B and upbeat EDM music. "Fly" discusses Amuro's sense of high lifestyle, using the lyric "Don't have to pay my flight / I'm living my own life / I've got my hands up, feeling free," as an example. Additionally, it is another EDM addition, with elements of dubstep and rock music. An alternative version was uploaded on the singer's YouTube channel. "B Who I Want 2 B", featuring Hatsune Miku, was produced by UK musician Sophie, and was described as one of the "weirder" additions to a major-pop album. Moreover, it was noted for its sonic influence of Computer music, more so described as "artificial". The dubstep-inspired "Stranger" was noted for its uptempo beat, alongside notes of reggaeton through its composition. "Every Woman" and "Space Invader" were noted as both "party" songs, the former described as a female empowerment anthem, while the latter incorporating elements of R&B, reggaeton and compared to the song "Single Ladies (Put a Ring on it)" by American artist Beyonce. The album's only ballad, "Anything", incorporates acoustic instrumentation, whereas the "formulatic" club anthem "What I Did for Love" closes the record.

Release and artworkGenic was released on June 10, 2015 in three physical formats, and for digital consumption. All three physical formats include a standard package that includes a 14-track compact disc, whereas two of the packaging's are DVD and Blu-Ray bundles that include 5 music videos, respectively. Included in the DVD/Blu-Ray formats are the visuals for her songs "Golden Touch", "Birthday", "Fashionista", "Stranger" and "Anything"; secret parts of these formats also feature access to a special selfie video for "Birthday", and a dance-only visual to "Fashionista". Additionally, art direction and the album's booklet was designed by Jun Hirota. First-press editions come with a digipak and a generic poster of the album's photoshoot. The album's artwork was photographed by Tisch, and features Amuro in black clothing and wearing a black-lace veil. The title Genic refers to the title track "Photogenic"; however, Amuro felt that the term "genic" could be interpreted in various establishing meanings.

Critical receptionGenic received positive reviews from most music critics. An editorial review at Billboard Japan commended the album's "colorful" mixture of genres, and described it as a "whole body of work". Japanese magazine CD Journal gave the album an honorary star rating, and commended Amuro's decision not to release any singles from the album, giving it an overall "bullishness" quality. They called the album "smart" and complimented the collaborations with David Guetta and Hatsune Miku. Lauren Du Pressis from Electric Bloom Magazine praised the singer's musical exploration and mature image, finding her a "chameleon force to the music industry". Although De Pressis was critical about the collaborations and the album's "repetitive" nature, she concluded "Any listeners of J-pop looking for something a little more mature should give it a go... You can't hide from an album this contagious."

Patrick St. Michel had reviewed the album with two publications, in two perspectives: Pitchfork Media (June 2015) and The Japan Times (November 2015). With Pitchfork Media, he awarded the album 6.7 points out of 10. He praised the album's "confident" and "inspired" vibe, and felt this was her best EDM offering after her previous efforts that he described as "cheap replicas". Although he was ambivalent towards her English deliveries, and some productions—namely "Every Woman", "It" and "What I Did for Love"—he concluded that Genics best moments was its "most straightforward." Five months later, he published a second review with The Japan Times, and stated, "Her busy EDM songs don’t always work and her English delivery still needs practice, but Genic is a solid collection of catchy pop tunes... It’s a heck of a comeback, and a well-earned one at that." Selective Hearing gave a positive review, saying "Overall this should please many Amuro fans immensely."

Genic has garnered Amuro with several accolades and awards. The music video for "Anything" was recognized by the FWA Designs Awards for website of the day, and month (June 15, 2015). At the 2015 Asia Design Awards, it received three specific ranking strategies: creativity (8.4 points), its content (8 points), and its visuals (7.8 points). The visual won the best innovative integration bronze award at the Spike Asia 2015 Awards, Amuro's first recognition at that ceremony. Moreover, the video to "Birthday" was nominated  for MTV Japan Music Video Award "Best Female Video Award", and independently for "Best Creativity Award" on October 15, 2015. Although Amuro won both awards respectively, she did not attend the ceremony. On December 18, the music video for "Golden Touch" was nominated for Song of the Year and Music Video of the Year by the Hello Asia! Music Awards.

Commercial performance
Billboard Japan reported a statement by Nielsen SoundScan Japan that Genic had a high chance at debuting at number one on both Japan's Oricon Albums Chart and Billboard's Top Albums Sales chart, pushing back entries by Japanese band Mr. Children and Japanese solo artist Superfly. As predicted, Genic topped both the Billboard Top Albums and Top Albums Sales chart on chart week June 22. The album slipped to number three and number four during the chart week of June 29. In total, the album spent a duration of 25 weeks on both charts, exiting outside the top 90 in its final week on both charts.

Genic debuted at number one on the daily Oricon Albums Chart with sales of 81,491 units. Moreover, it opened at number one on the weekly chart with 160,474 units sold, her third lowest first week sales for a studio album since 2001's Break the Rules (157,850 first week sales), and her 2003 album Style (93,142 first week sales). Despite this, Genic became the highest selling album by a female artist of 2015, which surpassed Superfly's entry White (2015). Genic fell to number the five the following week with 29,474 units, being replaced by Golden Bomber's No Music No Weapon (2014) and number six in its third week with 14,509 units. By the end of June, the album ranked at number two on Oricon's monthly chart. After a six-month sales duration, Genic was ranked the 16th best-selling album with over 246,269 units sold; this made it the best selling album by a solo artist, and the third best selling album by a female performing artist/group. As of May 2016, Genic has sold over 249,266 units, and was certified platinum in July 2015 by the Recording Industry Association of Japan (RIAJ) for physical shipments of 250,000 units.

Promoted songs

Although not physical singles were released, Amuro's rendition of David Guetta's track "What I Did for Love" was distributed as a promotional recording through iTunes on July 1, 2015. Nevertheless, several tracks on Genic were promoted. Amuro and vocaloid Hatsune Miku appeared on the cover of fashion magazine Nylon as digitized characters; the former singer confirmed that a music video would be produced with the two. Nylon TV premiered the music video for "B Who I Want 2 B" in mid-October 2015, presenting the singers in two-dimensional and 3D Anime form. As aforementioned, the music videos to "Golden Touch", "Birthday", "Fashionista", "Stranger" and "Anything" were promoted on Amuro's YouTube channel. Both "Birthday" and "Golden Touch" experienced success on two Billboard Japan charts; the former peaking at number 36 on Japan Hot 100, and the latter reaching number 43 on the Radio Songs chart.

The visual for "Golden Touch" was widely recognized by Western publications, noting it as the singer's breakthrough. According to the video's director, Masashi Kawamura, it was shot over a three-month period. Elle magazine compared the video to the sensation of optical illusions, calling it "Colorful, fun, gay ... but especially interactive." Japantrends.com believed that "Golden Touch" is "a good marketing stunt for a dying industry and overseas media has picked the story up too." Several international blogs and magazines, including BuzzFeed, Adobo magazine, Australia's Hello Asia website, and Australia's Hello Asia publicized the video positively, and was listed as music video of the month by Creative Review in the United Kingdom. On June 5, "Golden Touch" debuted in North America on SiriusXM Hits 1 as part of their YouTube 15 schedule, hosted and selected by American blogger and YouTube personality Jenna Marbles. After the original music video achieved 10 million views on YouTube, a second video premiered that included shots of Amuro.

Promotion and live performances

Amuro premiered the album throughout several radio stations in Japan, days before the album's release. Amuro announced her Livegenic tour in early mid June. The dates were confirmed via a flyer given out with the purchases of Genic, enclosed in the album's booklet. A total of 47 shows in several cities in Japan were scheduled, spanning from September 5 at the Saitama Super Arena, Saitama, and finishing the first leg on February 10 at the Makuhari Messe Event Hall in Chiba. An Asian leg was added to the tour, having Amuro play two dates in Taipei, Taiwan, and a sole show in Hong Kong. This was the singer's first visit since her 2012 5 Major Domes Tour: 20th Anniversary Best, where she traveled throughout various regions in Asia. A special website was hosted by Amuro's label Dimension Point, featuring various photos, digest films and other content supporting the tour.

A live album and DVD/Blu-Ray were recorded at the Yoyogi National Gymnasium on December 8. A total of 29 songs were added on the track list, including two bonus tracks "Break It" and "Arigatou", which was recorded at the Miyagi Super Arena, and a hidden video track of Amuro's song "Birthday". Titled Namie Amuro Livegenic 2015–2016, the formats were a success in Japan; it reached the top spot on the Oricon DVD chart and Blu-Ray Chart, and was certified gold by the Recording Industry Association of Japan (RIAJ) for shipments of 100,000 copies.

Set list

Shows

Track listing

Formats
 Standard CD – fourteen songs on one disc.
 First pressing standard CD – fourteen songs on one disc. First pressing issues include a bonus poster and house in a digipak.
 CD and DVD – fourteen songs on one disc. Includes five music videos and two special videos. 
 First pressing CD and DVD – fourteen songs on one disc. Includes five music videos and two special videos. First pressing issues include a bonus poster. 
 CD and Blu-ray – fourteen songs on one disc. Includes five music videos and two special videos. 
 First pressing CD and Bl-Ray – fourteen songs on one disc. Includes five music videos and two special videos. First pressing issues include a bonus poster. 
 Digital download – fourteen songs.

Personnel
Personnel details were sourced from Genics liner notes booklet.MusiciansGary Adkins – chorus vocals (#4)
Alisa – chorus vocals (#4)
Namie Amuro – main vocals
Olivia Burrell – chorus vocals (#4)
Jeroen de Rijk – tambourines (#14)
Sean Douglas – keyboards (#14)
Emyli – chorus vocals (#4), additional background vocals (#2, #5, #7-8, #10)
Bardur Haberg – all instruments (#5)
Hatsune Miku – vocals (#9)
Breyan Stanley Isaac – vocal background (#14)
Singo Kubota – guitar (#8)
Jocab Luttrell – vocal background (#14)
Sam Martin – keyboards (#14)
Neue Philharmonic Frankfurt – orchestra (#14)
Andreas Oberg – guitar, synth bass guitar (#1)
Candace Shields – vocal background (#14)
Giorgio Tuinfort – piano (#14)ImageryWakana Chiba – creative coordination
Jun Hirota – design
Eichi Matsunaga – manicurist
Akemi Nakano – hair, make-up
Akira Noda – stylist
Toshiyuki Suzuki – art direction
TISCH – photographerProduction'''

Johan Alkenas – producer (#3)
Sky Beatz – track producer (#10)
Kevin Charge – producer (#11)
Tom Coyne – mastering
Dimension Point – sound production, A&R
D.O.I. – mixing
Hiro Doi – music producer (#10)
James "Keyz" Foye – producer (#13)
David Guetta – instrumentation, producer, programmer (#14)
Bardur Haberg – producer (#5)
Jon Hällgren – producer (#6)
Kohei Hatakeyama – vocal recording (#2, #5-8, #10-11, #13)
Svante Halldin – producer (#4)
Jakob Hazell – producer (#4)
Hirofumi Iwanaga – Hatsune Miku vocal production coordination (#9)
Erik Lidbom – producer (#6)
Maria Marcus – producer (#1-2)
Raphaella Mazaheri-Asadi – vocal arrangement, vocal production (#5)
Mighty Mike – producer (#12)
Mitchie M – Hatsune Miku vocal production (#9)
Skylar Mones – producer (#8)
Wataru Namiusa – vocal recording (#1, #3-4, #9, #12, #14)
Joacim Persson – producer (#3)
Wataru Sasaki – Hatsune Miku vocal production coordination (#9)
Sophie – producer (#9)
Stella88 – management
Scott Stoddart – producer (#7)
Sunny Boy – producer (#8)
Giorgio Tuinfort – instrumentation, producer, programmer (#14)
Sam Wheat – recording engineer (#14)

Charts

Daily, weekly, and monthly charts

Year-end charts

Certification

Release history

See also
List of Oricon number-one albums of 2015

References

External links
Genic – Namie Amuro's website.
"B Who I Want to B" – Special 3D application website.
"Anything" – Special GIF website.
"Anything Extension" – Google Chrome extension download at Google Play.

2015 albums
Albums produced by David Guetta
Japanese-language albums
Namie Amuro albums
Albums produced by Sophie (musician)